Edward Joseph Gardner (August 7, 1898 – December 7, 1950) was a member of the United States House of Representatives from Ohio's third congressional district.

Biography
Gardner was born in Hamilton, Ohio, the son of Edward Gardner and his wife Mary.  His father came from Ireland as a child; his mother was born in Ohio. He attended the local parochial schools and was graduated from the College of Commerce and Finance of St. Xavier University in 1920. He did graduate work at Wharton School of Business of the University of Pennsylvania at Philadelphia and at the University of Cincinnati.

During the First World War, Gardner served as a private in the United States Army in 1918.

After the war, he took a job as district controller of a food distributing company at Philadelphia, Pennsylvania for four years and then worked as a public accountant at Hamilton, Ohio, from 1924 until his death in 1950.

In 1926, Gardner was elected to the Hamilton city council serving as president and vice mayor for two years.  He was elected a member of the Ohio House of Representatives in 1937 and again in 1941, serving two-year terms.  In 1944, he was elected as a Democrat to the Seventy-ninth Congress.  During his campaign Edward J. Gardner told fellow Democrats that he would work honestly and ceaselessly for employment of returning servicemen. "We must make a positive determination that there shall be jobs and wages, that there should be security from unemployment, thereby setting a market for production," he said.  During his term, he supported a temporary extension of wartime price controls and the draft and the right to strike.

President Truman's unpopularity overshadowed his reelection campaign in 1946 and he was defeated.

Returning to Hamilton, he continued his profession as a public accountant after his congressional service.  Edward Joseph Gardner died in Hamilton in 1950 and was interred in St. Mary's Cemetery.

Sources

 "World War II – On The Home Front" Dayton Daily News (OH) October 9, 1994 page, 1B.
 Reston, James. "Cleveland a Democrat Bridgehead But Rest of Ohio Seems GOP Camp," New York Times, Oct 19, 1946, pg. 10.

1898 births
1950 deaths
Democratic Party members of the Ohio House of Representatives
Politicians from Hamilton, Ohio
Xavier University alumni
University of Cincinnati alumni
Wharton School of the University of Pennsylvania alumni
United States Army soldiers
United States Army personnel of World War I
Democratic Party members of the United States House of Representatives from Ohio
20th-century American politicians